Akbarabad (also Romanized as Akbarābād) is a village in Qolqol Rud Rural District, Qolqol Rud District, Tuyserkan County, Hamadan Province, Iran. At the 2006 census, its population was 111, in 25 families.

References 

Populated places in Tuyserkan County